Raritan Valley Community College (RVCC) is a public community college in North Branch, New Jersey. RVCC offers Associate degree programs leading to an Associate of Arts (A.A.), Associate of Science (A.S.), Associate of Fine Art (A.F.A), or an Associate of Applied Science (A.A.S.), as well as certificate programs and continuing education courses.

The college was founded in late 1965 as Somerset County College and opened to its first class of students in the fall of 1968. It was given its present name in 1987, when it became the county college for Hunterdon County as well as its home of Somerset County.  It was the first community college in New Jersey to be sponsored by two different counties. Raritan Valley's University Center offers degree completion programs from a number of schools and university partners including Rutgers University.

Accreditation
Raritan Valley Community College is accredited by the Middle States Association of Colleges and Schools. Programs offered by the college are accredited by the New Jersey Board of Nursing, the National League of Nursing, the Commission on Opticianry Accreditation and by the American Bar Association.

Library 
The library at Raritan Valley Community College officially opened in March, 1985, along with the College Performing Arts Center. In 1993, the 25th anniversary of the college, the library was named in honor of founding trustee Evelyn S. Field.

The Evelyn S. Field Library is the center for research and information at Raritan Valley Community College. The library faculty develops the collection in collaboration with classroom faculty to support the educational program.

The Evelyn S. Field Library provides borrowing privileges and discretionary access to information and resource sharing for Somerset and Hunterdon county residents.

References

External links 

Official website

Garden State Athletic Conference
Education in Hunterdon County, New Jersey
Universities and colleges in Somerset County, New Jersey
New Jersey County Colleges
Two-year colleges in the United States
Educational institutions established in 1965
Branchburg, New Jersey
NJCAA athletics
1965 establishments in New Jersey